Christophe Borbiconi (born 26 February 1973) is a French former professional football player and manager. As a player, he was a centre-back. He scored eight goals in 222 Division 2 games in France.

Personal life 
Christophe's younger brother Stéphane is also a former footballer.

Honours 
Sedan

 Coupe de France runner-up: 1998–99

References 

1973 births
Living people
Sportspeople from Meurthe-et-Moselle
French footballers
Association football defenders
AS Nancy Lorraine players
Louhans-Cuiseaux FC players
CS Sedan Ardennes players
AS Beauvais Oise players
Nîmes Olympique players
Olympique Alès players
F91 Dudelange players
Ligue 2 players
Championnat National players
Division d'Honneur players
Luxembourg National Division players
French expatriate footballers
Expatriate footballers in Luxembourg
French expatriate sportspeople in Luxembourg

French football managers
Thionville FC managers
Footballers from Grand Est